The Sawayaka Welfare Foundation (Sawayaka Fukushi Zaidan) is a Japanese foundation.  Founded in 1991 by Tsutomu Hotta, former inspector and lawyer, under the name Sawayaka Welfare Promotion Center, it has been promoting its Fureai kippu system as a means to make a new “Fureai society”.

See also 
 Local currency

External links 

Foundations based in Japan